Amazophrynella is a genus of toads in the family Bufonidae. They are found throughout the Amazon Basin.

Taxonomy
Amazophrynella was separated from Dendrophryniscus in 2012 based on molecular genetic evidence that indicated deep divergence between an Amazonian and an Atlantic Forest clade, the latter retaining the name Dendrophryniscus whereas the former was described as a new genus Amazonella, later amended to Amazophrynella because of homonymy. The analysis suggested that Amazophrynella is the sister taxon of Dendrophryniscus, but a later study has suggested a more distant relationship.

Description
The hind limbs are well developed. The parotoid glands are absent, as are vocal slits and tympana. The skin is uniformly and finely granulose. Dorsal coloration is cryptic.

Amazophrynella are pond breeders, which is presumably an ancestral trait in bufonids (most Dendrophryniscus breed in phytotelmata).

Species
There are twelve recognized species:
 Amazophrynella amazonicola Rojas, Carvalho, Ávila, Farias, Gordo, and Hrbek, 2015
 Amazophrynella bilinguis Kaefer, Rojas, Ferrão, Farias & Lima, 2019
 Amazophrynella bokermanni (Izecksohn, 1994)
Amazophrynella gardai Mângia, Koroiva & Santana, 2020
 Amazophrynella javierbustamantei Rojas-Zamora, Chaparro, Carvalho, Ávila, Farias, Hrbek, and Gordo, 2016
 Amazophrynella manaos Rojas, Carvalho, Ávila, Farias, and Hrbek, 2014
 Amazophrynella matses Rojas, Carvalho, Ávila, Farias, Gordo, and Hrbek, 2015
 Amazophrynella minuta (Melin, 1941)
 Amazophrynella moisesii Rojas-Zamora, Fouquet, Ron, Hernández-Ruz, Melo-Sampaio, Chaparro, Vogt, Carvalho, Pinheiro, Ávila, Farias, Gordo, and Hrbek, 2018
 Amazophrynella siona Rojas-Zamora, Fouquet, Ron, Hernández-Ruz, Melo-Sampaio, Chaparro, Vogt, Carvalho, Pinheiro, Ávila, Farias, Gordo, and Hrbek, 2018
 Amazophrynella teko Rojas-Zamora, Fouquet, Ron, Hernández-Ruz, Melo-Sampaio, Chaparro, Vogt, Carvalho, Pinheiro, Ávila, Farias, Gordo, and Hrbek, 2018
 Amazophrynella vote Ávila, Carvalho, Gordo, Kawashita-Ribeiro, and Morais, 2012
 Amazophrynella xinguensis Rojas-Zamora, Fouquet, Ron, Hernández-Ruz, Melo-Sampaio, Chaparro, Vogt, Carvalho, Pinheiro, Ávila, Farias, Gordo, and Hrbek, 2018

References

 
Amphibian genera
Amphibians of South America